Nancy Goes to Rio is a Technicolor musical comedy film released by Metro-Goldwyn-Mayer in 1950. It was directed by Robert Z. Leonard and produced by Joe Pasternak from a screenplay by Sidney Sheldon, based on a story by Ralph Block, Frederick Kohner, and Jane Hall. The music was directed and supervised by George Stoll and includes compositions by George and Ira Gershwin, Giacomo Puccini, Jack Norworth, and Stoll.

The film stars Ann Sothern, Jane Powell, Barry Sullivan, Carmen Miranda, Louis Calhern, and Scotty Beckett.

Plot
On the closing night of a Broadway play, leading actress Frances Elliott (Ann Sothern) hosts a party attended by many guests, including her eccentric father Gregory (Louis Calhern), who is also an actor; her seventeen-year-old daughter, Nancy Barklay (Jane Powell), an aspiring actress; and Brazilian playwright Ricardo Domingos, who is considering starring Frances in his next play.

Frances eagerly pursues the part in Ricardo's play, and though she is virtually assured of the role, Ricardo asks her not publicize the news until a final decision is made. Later, Ricardo privately tells Frances' producer that Frances may not be right for the part and that he had a younger actress in mind. Then, when Ricardo meets Nancy, he instantly knows that he has found the perfect young woman for the role.

The next day, Frances sets sail for Rio de Janeiro, where she intends to vacation and devote herself to studying her lines. Gregory accompanies Frances to Rio, while Nancy, who is about to star in a small stock company play, goes to Connecticut. After observing Nancy's acting abilities, Ricardo offers her the part that he promised Frances. Nancy accepts the role, though she is unaware that Ricardo has already promised it to her mother.

Seeking the quiet she needs to study for the part, Nancy follows her mother and grandfather to Rio. On board the ship, businessman Paul Berten overhears Nancy rehearsing her lines and mistakenly concludes that she is a deserted wife and an expectant mother. Paul takes pity on Nancy and enlists the help of his business partner, Marina Rodrigues (Carmen Miranda), to counsel the young girl.

Nancy does not know that Paul is trying to help her and mistakes his paternal concern for a marriage proposal. She rejects Paul's apparent proposal, and bids him farewell when the ship reaches Rio.

Soon after she is reunited with her mother, Nancy overhears her rehearsing her lines and immediately realizes that they are studying for the same part. The revelation devastates Nancy and prompts her to bow out of the play. She does not tell her mother that she was set to star in Ricardo's play, and instead informs her that she is in an entirely different play.

Confusion abounds when Nancy later visits Paul at his office and tries to accept the marriage proposal she thought he had made. Paul is perplexed by her behavior, and still thinks that Nancy is pregnant and troubled. He sends her home to talk to her mother about her situation, but Nancy misunderstands him and thinks that he meant for her to discuss their impending marriage with her mother.
 
Marina follows Nancy to her mother's house, and privately tells Frances about Nancy's supposed pregnancy. The confusion is heightened when Frances misunderstands her daughter's anguish and concludes that she must be pregnant by Paul.

Frances demands a private meeting with Paul, during which he reveals his romantic attraction to Frances. Frances leaves Paul in disgust, but the situation is soon clarified when Paul tells Gregory that he had only just met Nancy on the boat. Gregory immediately recognizes Nancy's supposed predicament from the story of the play that Frances was reading, and explains the situation to Frances.

When Frances learns the truth about Paul, she changes her impression of him and they embark on a romance. After announcing her engagement to Paul, Frances withdraws from Ricardo's play and suggests Nancy as her replacement. All ends happily when the show opens in New York with Nancy in the starring role.

Cast
 Ann Sothern as Frances Elliott
 Jane Powell as Nancy Barklay 
 Barry Sullivan as Paul Berten 
 Carmen Miranda as Marina Lopes Souza Rodrigues 
 Louis Calhern as Gregory Elliott 
 Scotty Beckett as Scotty Sheridan 
 Fortunio Bonanova as Ricardo Domingos 
 Glenn Anders as Arthur Barrett 
 Nella Walker as Mrs. Harrison 
 Hans Conried as Alfredo 
 Frank Fontaine as The Masher
 John Goldsworthy as Butler
 Michael Raffetto as Purser (uncredited)

Production
The working titles of this film were Ambassador to Brazil and His Excellency from Brazil.

The 1940 Universal film It's a Date, produced by Joe Pasternak, directed by William A. Seiter and starring Deanna Durbin and Kay Francis, was also based on Jane Hall, Frederick Kohner and Ralph Block's screen story.

Despite the title and some colorful second-unit footage, the film was mostly filmed on MGM's soundstages. The production makes use of lavish, elegant "New Look" gowns and colorful sets, typical of the top-notch MGM standards.

This was the final film of Ann Sothern's MGM contract; she soon moved on to appear in a series of television sitcoms.

Musical numbers
 "Time and Time Again", music by Fred Spielman, lyrics by Earl Brent 
 "Shine On, Harvest Moon", music by Nora Bayes, lyrics by Jack Norworth  
 "Magic Is the Moonlight", music and lyrics by María Grever (song "Te quiero dijiste"), English lyrics by Charles Pasquale  
 "Nancy's Goin' to Rio", music by Georgie Stoll, lyrics by Earl Brent 
 "Cae Cae", music by Roberto Martins, lyrics by Pedro Barrios, English lyrics by John Latouche
 "Yipsee-I-O", music and lyrics by Ray Gilbert 
 "Embraceable You", music by George Gershwin, lyrics by Ira Gershwin 
 "Baião (Ca-Room' Pa Pa)", written by Humberto Teixeira and Luiz Gonzaga, English lyrics by Ray Gilbert 
 "Musetta's Waltz" from the opera La Bohème, music by Giacomo Puccini, libretto by Giuseppe Giacosa and Luigi Illica
 "Love is Like This" music by Pixinguinha, lyrics by João de Barro (song "Carinhoso"), English lyrics by Ray Gilbert

Reception
According to MGM records the film earned $1,839,000 in the US and Canada and $1,027,000 elsewhere, resulting in a loss of $52,000.

Variety commented that "Nancy Goes to Rio is all that the light, musical glittering should be" and "Joe Pasternak has framed his production with nine tunes and a group of production numbers." Dave Kehr of the Chicago Tribune, said "The mother and daughter team gold-digging is a pretty perverse idea for an MGM musical."

The film critic of the New York Times, Bosley Crowther wrote that "A few nice songs, some amiable clowning on the part of Louis Calhern and an eye-filling MGM production are the only ingredients worth mentioning."

The St. Petersburg Times commenting on the film, said "Gay music, fetching costumes, laughs aplenty and pretty scenery make Nancy Goes to Rio, a wholly enjoyable film." But "Technicolor isn't kind to Ann Sothern, who looks much older, or to a blonded Carmen Miranda, who loses some of her attractiveness, but it does glorify Louis Calhern, who's not young. It also does things for Jane Powell."

Home media 
The film was released on DVD along with Two Weeks with Love as part of the Classic Musicals from the Dream Factory, Vol. 3. The set also included several other Powell films, such as Hit the Deck and Deep in My Heart. This DVD was re-released on November 28, 2017 under the Warner Archive Collection on DVD.

References

External links
 
 
 
 
 Nancy Goes to Rio at NNDB

1950 films
1950 musical comedy films
1950 romantic comedy films
American musical comedy films
American romantic comedy films
American romantic musical films
Remakes of American films
Films about actors
Films set in Rio de Janeiro (city)
Metro-Goldwyn-Mayer films
Films directed by Robert Z. Leonard
Films produced by Joe Pasternak
Films scored by Georgie Stoll
1950s English-language films
1950s American films